Robert Heaton Rhodes (1815 – 1 June 1884) was a New Zealand politician, who represented the Akaroa electorate from 1871 to 1874, when he resigned. He was elected unopposed in 1871.

Born in 1815 in Rotherham, in the English county of Yorkshire, he followed his brothers, including William Barnard Rhodes, to New Zealand in 1850, having worked in Australia. He lived at Purau and managed properties on Banks Peninsula belonging to the Rhodes brothers. He built a large house in Christchurch, Elmwood, where he died. He was a founder of several early business enterprises, including the New Zealand Shipping Company and the Kaiapoi Woollen Manufacturing Company.

On 24 August 1853, Rhodes stood in the Akaroa electorate for a position in the House of Representatives but was beaten by William Sefton Moorhouse. On 31 August 1853, Rhodes stood in the Akaroa electorate for one of two positions on the Canterbury Provincial Council. Rhodes won the election but there was a draw for second place and the returning officer gave his casting vote to Rev. William Aylmer, meaning that Moorhouse was not elected. A short time later, Moorhouse stood in the same electorate for the House of Representatives and was successful.

His eldest son Sir Heaton Rhodes (1861–1956) had a long Parliamentary career.

References

George Rhodes of the Levels and his brothers by A.E. Woodhouse (1937, Whitcombe & Tombs, Auckland)
The Rhodes Brothers from the 1966 Encyclopaedia of New Zealand

External links

 Elmwood in 1899, now the site of Heaton Normal Intermediate

1815 births
1884 deaths
Members of the New Zealand House of Representatives
New Zealand MPs for South Island electorates
Members of Canterbury provincial executive councils
Unsuccessful candidates in the 1853 New Zealand general election
English emigrants to New Zealand
People from Rotherham
19th-century New Zealand politicians
Moorhouse–Rhodes family